Interesting Times: The Secret of My Success is a 2002 Chinese documentary film by director Duan Jinchuan about China's contemporary politics of democracy and the realities of the one child policy. The director shows how this policy is being implemented in Fanshen, a rural village in Northeast China.

This film is part of the 2002 series 'Interesting Times' showing different aspects of modern life in China:
 The secret of my success - shows how Chinese politics are implemented in the countryside.
 The war of love Directors: Duan Jinchuan & Jiang Yue - is a portrait of a marriage broker.
 Xiao’s long march Director: Wu Gong - about the People's Liberation Army.
 This happy life Director: Jiang Yue - aims to define the concept of political education in China.

Awards
IDFA Award for best Mid-Length Documentary (2002)

References

External links
 
 
 Interesting times: the secrets of my success documentary online

Chinese documentary films
2002 films
2002 documentary films
One-child policy
2000s Chinese films